The Himalayan thrush or Himalayan forest thrush (Zoothera salimalii) is a species of bird described in 2016 and separated out from the alpine thrush Zoothera mollissima with which they were formerly lumped. The species is separated on the basis of phylogenetic studies that suggest that the population diverged from the common ancestor at least 3 million years ago (estimates vary from 3-6 mya). The alpine thrush (Zoothera mollissima in the restricted sense) breeds above the tree line whereas the Himalayan thrush breeds in forested habitats. The species differs in its song from that of the alpine thrush. The Himalayan thrush has a more musical call while that of the Alpine thrush is raspy and grating. A newly discovered Himalayan forest thrush bird was named after the birdman of India, Ornithologist Dr.Salim Ali. The name of the bird is "Zoothera salimalii". A fruit bat is also named after him "Latidens salimalii"

The species name is given in honour of the distinguished Indian ornithologist Sálim Ali.

The tree-dwelling species has shorter legs, tail and wings but a longer bill than its Alpine counterpart, and uses the shorter legs and tails to help it manoeuvre around in the forest.

References

Himalayan thrush
Birds of India
Birds of the Himalayas
Himalayan thrush
Himalayan thrush
Himalayan thrush